Markadong Hudas is a 1994 Philippine action film directed by Eddie Rodriguez. The film stars Cesar Montano as the title role.

Cast
 Cesar Montano as Daniel Braganza
 Dina Bonnevie as Rodelina Vergado
 Jun Aristorenas as Don Gonzalo Vergado
 Daniel Fernando as Col. Manolo Nantes
 Teresa Loyzaga as Myrna
 Berting Labra as Berto
 Chin-Chin Rodriguez as Rea
 Dick Israel as Olivares
 Ernie Zarate as Col. Romero
 Johnny Vicar as Mr. Taningco
 Marco Polo Garcia as Rizaldy
 Rommel Montano as Rizaldy's Brother
 Joey Padilla as Jake
 Romy Romulo as Oca
 Boy Roque as Brando

References

External links

1994 films
1994 action films
Filipino-language films
Philippine action films
Viva Films films
Films directed by Eddie Rodriguez